The Reprise Theatre Company was a theater company founded by Marcia Seligson in 1997, in Los Angeles, California. Reprise Theatre Company was the resident company at the Freud Playhouse and Wadsworth, staging revival productions.

History

Marcia Seligson served as Founder and Producing Artistic Director from 1997 - 2006. From 1998 - 2001 Ronn Goswick served as the Managing Director.  He left in 2002 when she was joined by Producing Director, Jim Gardia, who stayed with the company in that role until 2008, with a brief stint as Producing Artistic Director during the 2006-07 Season. Danny Feldman took on the role of Managing Director in 2006 and served in that position until he left in 2010. Jason Alexander became Artistic Director of the company in 2007. He was joined by Susan Dietz in the role of Producing Director in 2008 until she left in 2010. 

Gilles Chiasson joined the company as Producing Director in 2010. Christine Bernardi Weil assumed the role of Managing Director that same year, both partnering with Jason Alexander to run the company. 

After years of well-received performances, the company was forced to cancel several productions in 2011 due to budgetary concerns. In February 2012, the Board announced a production hiatus, citing dwindling ticket sales. In June 2013, a letter to subscribers announced they were ceasing operations due to what the Los Angeles Times reported was difficulty obtaining "sustained funding".

Seasons

2011-2012 season 
 Cabaret

2010-2011 season 
 They're Playing Our Song 
 Gigi 
 Kiss Me, Kate

Special events 
 An Evening With Liz Callaway 
 A Party With Marty 
 An Evening with Sutton Foster 
 Betty Buckley in Broadway By Request 
 Barry Manilow In Concert
 Barbara Cook In Concert 
 Ray Romano Live

2010 season 
 Carousel 
 A Funny Thing Happened on the Way to the Forum 
 How to Succeed in Business Without Really Trying 
 Two by Two

Special Events 
 Jerry Seinfeld Live! 
 Audra McDonald in Concert
 An Intimate Evening with Marvin Hamlisch

Richard Rodgers Celebration 
 Soul of Rodgers 
 Rodgers & Asia 
 South Pacific Film Screening 
 Rodgers & Hart & Hammerstein 
 A Grand Night For Dancing 
 Nothin' Like A Dame 
 The Sweetest Sounds

2008-09 season 
 Once on This Island 
 I Love My Wife 
 Man of La Mancha 
 The Fantasticks

Special Events 
 Ben Vereen: Up Close & Musical 
 An Evening With Kristin Chenoweth 
 Brian Stokes Mitchell Sings Broadway 
 Broadway Under The Stars

2007-08 season 
 On Your Toes 
 Damn Yankees 
 The Odd Couple 
 Li'l Abner 
 Flora the Red Menace

Special Events 
 Patti LuPone: Coulda, Woulda, Shoulda 
 Carol Burnett in Conversation

2006-07 season 
 My One and Only 
 Sunday in the Park with George 
 No Strings

2005-06 season 
 On the Town 
 City of Angels 
 Zorba

2004-05 season 
 Brigadoon 
 Pippin 
 Applause

2003-04 season 
 Babes in Arms 
 Kismet
 Company

2002-03 season 
 Anything Goes 
 On the Twentieth Century 
 She Loves Me

2001-02 season 
 1776 
 The Most Happy Fella 
 Gentlemen Prefer Blondes

2000-01 season 
 Call Me Madam 
 Mack and Mabel 
 Strike Up the Band

1999 season 
 Bells Are Ringing
 The Boys from Syracuse 
 Fiorello!

1998 season 
 The Pajama Game 
 The Threepenny Opera 
 Of Thee I Sing

1997 season 
 Promises, Promises 
 Finian's Rainbow 
 Wonderful Town

Awards and nominations

See also
Center Theatre Group of Los Angeles

References

Further reading

Musical theatre companies
Theatre companies in Los Angeles